RHV or Rhv can refer to:

Reservehandverfahren
Reid-Hillview Airport (IATA code: RHV)
Rhv, the abbreviation for the orchid genus × Rhynchovanda
Red Hat Virtualization
Registered Health Visitor